Ghostkeeper is a Canadian experimental pop/rock band led by Shane Ghostkeeper, who writes most of the songs, and includes members Sarah Houle, drummer Eric Hamelin and bassist Ryan Bourne. Their songs combine elements of '60s girl-group melodies, country music,  ‘90s indie rock, African pop, and traditional Aboriginal pow wow music.

History
Ghostkeeper's debut album Children of the Great Northern Muskeg was released on Saved by Radio in July 2008 in Canada. It was recorded by Lorrie Matheson.

The band's second album, titled Ghostkeeper, was released in March, 2010 by Flemish Eye Records.  It was recorded by Jay Crocker and Scott Munro. The album, released on Flemish Eye Records, focuses on both Shane Ghostkeeper and Sarah Houle's northern Albertan origins. The album debuted at #32 on Earshot's Top 50, #6 on Chart Attack's Top 30 and at #28 on CBC Radio 3's Top 30 in the first week of March, 2010.

In 2012 Ghostkeeper release an album, Horse Chief! War Thief!, on the Saved by Radio label. In 2017 the band recorded another album, Sheer Blouse Buffalo Knocks.

Discography
 Children of the Great Northern Muskeg (Saved by Radio, 2008)
 Ghostkeeper (Flemish Eye Records, 2010)
 Horse Chief! War Thief! (Saved By Radio, 2012)
 Sheer Blouse Buffalo Knocks (2017)
 Multidimensional Culture (2022)

Members
Shane Ghostkeeper (guitar, vocals)
Sarah Houle (drums synth, vocals)
Ryan Bourne (multiple instruments)
Eric Hamelin (drums)

See also

Music of Canada
Canadian rock
List of Canadian musicians
List of bands from Canada
:Category:Canadian musical groups

References

External links
 Ghostkeeper at the Flemish Eye website
 Ghostkeeper at the Saved By Radio website

Musical groups established in 2008
Canadian folk rock groups
Canadian blues musical groups
Musical groups from Calgary
2008 establishments in Alberta
Canadian indie folk groups